Heightingtonaspis is an extinct genus of primitive arthrodire placoderm with two species previously allied with the genus Kujdanowiaspis.

The fossils of H. anglica were first discovered on the surface at Besom Farm Quarry, Shropshire, England and the fossils were radiocarbon dated in situ to 416 million years old.

References

Placoderms of Europe
Placoderms
Fossil taxa described in 1969